The Renewable Energy and Energy Efficiency Partnership (REEEP) is a Vienna-based international organisation (link in German) that advances markets for renewable energy and energy efficiency with a particular emphasis on the emerging markets and developing countries. Its primary focus is in de-risking and scaling up clean energy business models.

REEEP was originally launched by the government of the United Kingdom, along with other partners, at the Johannesburg World Summit on Sustainable Development (WSSD) in August 2002.

Origins
In 2002, accelerating the development of renewable energy and energy efficiency technologies was one of the priorities of a large group of countries at the WSSD. Margaret Beckett, then UK Minister for the Environment announced the initiative to form REEEP at the summit's closing session. It grew from an agreement with other committed governments, businesses and NGOs to deliver WSSD commitments others, in particular to take forward the key recommendations of the G8 Renewable Energy Task Force.

From January 2003 until May 2004, the REEEP was housed within the UK Foreign and Commonwealth Office (FCO) where it continued following the UN Type II Partnership process of stakeholder consultation. In June 2004, REEEP obtained formal, legal non-profit status as an international NGO and has since been located at the UN complex in Vienna, Austria. In 2016, REEEP was granted status as a quasi-international organisation in Austria, along with four other organisations.

Business model

It pursues its market catalyst role via an approach it calls "Invest – Learn – Share":

Invest
A typical REEEP Invest-Learn-Share effort begins with a country or regional level analysis to determine market gaps and opportunities for clean technology deployment; a stakeholder landscape to understand key players and influencers; and an assessment of medium to long-term (5 to 15-year) market potential for delivering climate and sustainable development outcomes. These assessments are synthesised into a project strategy outlining technology and sector targets; investment vehicles and volumes; policy and regulatory considerations; ecosystem stakeholders and evidence requirements; and engagement strategies.

The investment solicitation and selection process begins once capitalisation has been secured through donor agreements. The process is typically launched via a call for proposals. Specifics of the call are adaptable, and depend on the realities of the market, as well as upon timing and administrative requirements of donors and local stakeholders. In some cases, multiple capital pools may be combined into a single call for proposals; in other cases, beneficiaries are identified through recommendations from expert networks and approached on an ad hoc basis.

In those cases where capitalisation is provided through a debt-issuing revolving fund, smaller calls for proposals may be issued as the fund is recapitalised by loan repayments. These innovative vehicles represent a promising new approach to growing investment in sectors that have fallen through the finance cracks due to ticket sizes (too large for microfinance, too small for private equity or commercial debt).

As part of a proposal SMEs are required to submit an application form, including a draft business plan, demonstrating their ability to provide a viable, clean technology-based product or service to a market in a least developed country (LDC) or middle-income country (MIC). SMEs are challenged to demonstrate how a business plan will lead to certain outcomes connected to REEEP's core principles: reducing the effects of climate change and building local prosperity. In some cases, these outcomes may be integrated into the selection processes as specific procurement objectives, allowing for results-based financing.

After initial application and due diligence process, successful applicants develop a strategic plan incorporating a stakeholder analysis, key activities, outputs and outcomes, benchmarking and key performance indicators (KPIs), and contingency planning, among other elements.

This strategic plan forms the basis of entry as a project investment. Throughout its work, REEEP uses Results-Based Finance methods to verify project progress.

Learn
REEEP utilises a mixed methodology approach to monitoring, evaluation and learning designed to handle the complexity of the situations our investments face on the ground and the multiplicity of stakeholders involved, and to manage the various types and volumes of information flowing in and out of the project environment.

REEEP uses a Theory of Change as a high level project strategy guide, taking into account market context and cross-cutting considerations. For each investment REEEP makes as part of a market acceleration project, it develops a SME-specific strategic plan that incorporates a stakeholder analysis; key activities, outputs and outcomes; benchmarking and key performance indicators (KPIs); and contingency planning, among other elements. This strategy typically includes a Logical Framework Approach (Logframe) template.

The plan is designed to ensure that the investment logic will lead to project objectives. We internally test the business plan, including activities, structure and strategy for growth, to confirm they have been adequately planned to deliver a high probability of success. In cases where intelligence and evidence from similar projects would suggest altering the business plan, we will consult with the submitter on making appropriate changes.

REEEP also works with entrepreneurs to perform Outcome Mapping, a critical element of any project that relies on specific actions or behavioural changes from a broad group of stakeholders amid imperfect market settings. The Outcome Mapping begins with an analysis of stakeholders — individuals, organisations, government bodies, etc. — who influence the ability of a project to reach an objective. In doing so, REEEP tests entrepreneurs’ understanding of the stakeholder landscape: Are they aware of existing and potential competitors? Do they understand customer needs and unique characteristics? Are they relying upon a policy change in the future for their business model to be viable, and if so what are they doing to bring the change about? We track identified behavioural changes (or non-changes) that occur throughout the project. By understanding people, relationships and behaviours we can allow for real-time reflection and rapid reaction.

Finally, REEEP captures significant changes and impacts through a method of storytelling with an open format dialogue. These changes — known as Most Significant Changes — can be planned or unplanned, positive or negative, and the precise nature of these changes may be equally unknown beforehand. By recording and processing these elements we can adjust business plans, project scope or overall strategy if necessary. Combining these components leads to a holistic framework greater than the sum of its parts, which captures a broad range of key information and variety that make up the complex systems in which we are operating.

Share
Market intelligence produced by the Monitoring, Evaluation and Learning process is directed into three information flows: the first is a dynamic feedback loop into the Theory of Change and project strategy review; the other two are outward flows of business intelligence and policy intelligence, respectively.

Commercial intelligence comprises the full range of business and investment-related data and insights, which are further processed to derive actionable commercial best practices. These are anonymised and synthesised to advise other SME investments in the REEEP portfolio on best practices. At the same time, REEEP generates actionable investment intelligence, which can influence or even lead to concrete investment pipelines for larger investors (multilateral development banks, impact investors, venture (growth) capital funds, mezzanine funds etc.). This intelligence is a critical de-risking mechanism for specific downstream investors, as well as the investment climate in general.

Policy intelligence, comprising data and information on the ecosystem conditions of specific markets (including legal, regulatory, economic and political circumstances that act as external influencers on business and market activity), are further processed to derive actionable practice-based policy learning and recommendations. These can be utilised by partner organisations and decision makers involved in legislation and/or other policy and regulatory development processes. The form of REEEP's practiced-based policy will vary depending upon case to fit the needs of the policy making process in question.

Although there is a logical sequence to the Invest-Learn-Share approach, this does not imply rigidity in timing; rather, it is an iterative process, in which stakeholders, such as regulators, policy makers and financial actors, are included early and at regular intervals in the project throughout its lifetime.

To date the organisation has been funded primarily by governments including: Australia, Austria, Canada, Germany, Ireland, Italy, Spain, Switzerland, The Netherlands, The United Kingdom, The United States and the European Commission.

Project interventions
In the first phase of its existence (2002-2014) REEEP acted largely as a re-granting institution, funding nearly 200 projects. The majority have targeted emerging markets such as India, China, South Africa and Brazil.

These REEEP projects attempted to address two key barriers to clean energy development, and gather and aggregate information on them:
 Policy and regulation: promoting clear government policies and favourable, transparent and stable regulatory frameworks that will encourage long-term investment in renewable energy and energy efficiency
 Innovative finance and business models: supporting new forms of financing, risk mitigation and business models to make small-sized renewable and energy efficient projects bankable.
Since 2014, REEEP dramatically focused its work toward the targeted "de-risking" of specific markets and sectors, such as solar-powered irrigation systems in East Africa, solar-powered dairy cooling in Bangladesh, or innovative decentralized mini-grid models in Tanzania.

Regionally, REEEP has shifted concentration to low- and middle-income countries, although it continues to work in India and South Africa, which are generally considered to be emerging markets:
 East Africa: Kenya, Tanzania, Uganda
 Southern Africa: South Africa, Zambia, Botswana
 Southeast Asia: Cambodia, Myanmar
 South Asia: India, Bangladesh, Nepal

REEEP's ongoing projects include:
 Power Africa: Beyond the Grid Fund for Zambia - a major fund to stimulate markets for off-grid electrification solutions in Zambia
 Powering Agrifood Value Chains - a project to develop evidence-based intervention guidance for energy utilisation in the food-producing agricultural sector. 
 Climate Change, Clean Energy and Urban Water Works in Southern Africa - a joint REEEP-UNIDO project to accelerate market-based solutions for energy-related investment to improve municipal water works in Southern Africa.
 SWITCH Africa Green - a project to support African countries in their transition to an Inclusive Green Economy and promoting sustainable consumption and production (SCP) practices and patterns.
 Climate Knowledge Brokers Group - a community of practice that furthers improvements and efficiency gains in the global climate knowledge system.

Internet-based resources

Climate Tagger

Climate Tagger is a project to help organizations catalog their data and information in a consistent manner.

reegle.info
reegle (in lower-case) was a clean energy information portal designed to provide easy access to highly reliable information on renewable energy and energy efficiency. The website draws information from eight different open data sources such as the World Bank, UNdata, OpenEI, the CIA Factbook, and the REEEP Sustainable Energy Regulation Network publications to provide understanding of energy issues.

reegle was developed by REEEP in collaboration with REN21, and was funded by the governments of Germany, Netherlands, United Kingdom. As of March 2012, the website attracted an average of 220,000 users per month. During 2011, 59% of its users came from Africa and Asia, underlining the site's character as an information resource for developing countries and emerging markets. reegle was an advocate of the Linked Open Data movement, which seeks to make public data available on the web in open formats that are machine-readable.

Partners
Currently REEEP has 385 partners, 45 of which are governments, including all the G7 countries and key government agencies from India and China, other emerging markets and the developing world. Partners also include a range of businesses, NGOs and civil society organisations.

REEEP operates within a diverse constellation of players, and collaborates with other international structures and organisations to maximise replication and minimise duplication of efforts. Among other organisations, REEEP is actively engaged with the United Nations Industrial Development Organization (UNIDO), the International Renewable Energy Agency (IRENA), the International Energy Agency (IEA), MEDREP, the Global Village Energy Partnership  (GVEP),CLASP, the Johannesburg Renewable Energy Coalition (JREC), GNESD, EREC, NAIMA, EURIMA, e-parliament and GFSE.

See also

 Johannesburg Renewable Energy Coalition (JREC)
 Renewable energy commercialization
 Renewable Energy Policy Network for the 21st Century (REN21)
 World Business Council for Sustainable Development (WBSCD)
 World Summit on Sustainable Development (WSSD)

References

External links
 IRENA
 REEEP Southern Africa Secretariat
 Renewable Energy and Energy Efficiency Partnership  (REEEP)
 The Renewable Energy & Energy Efficiency Partnership (REEEP) Tackles Energy Poverty

International renewable energy organizations
Non-profit organisations based in Austria
Organisations based in Vienna